Maritza Morillas (born 1969) is a contemporary painter from Mexico. Her works are typified by dark imagery of death and decomposition. Her work also delves into social issues such as contemporary the food industry, with imagery of the preternatural and horrific techniques used in factory farming. She is also well known in Mexico for her work dealing with the deaths in Ciudad Juárez, the mass murder of young women along the U.S.-Mexico border.

Morillas graduated from the school of artes plásticas at UNAM (Universidad Nacional Autónoma de México). Major influences on her work are Francisco de Goya and Arturo Rivera. She is currently a member of MujerArte A.C., a Mexican feminist art collective led by artist and social justice activist Yan Maria Castro.

External links
 Women Painters and the genocide of women in Ciudad Juarez, Mexico Page discussing the work of Morillas dealing with the murders of women in Ciudad Juarez on MujerArte A.C. website
 Juárez: Art Against Death Article by artist and cultural critic Monica Mayer about the place of Morillas and other contemporary Mexican feminist artists in the tradition of Latin American female activist artists, originally published in El Universal
 Maritza Morillas page on the MujerArte art collective website Picture of Morillas and samples of her work (in Spanish)

1969 births
Living people
Mexican contemporary artists
Modern painters
Mexican feminists
Mexican women painters
20th-century Mexican painters
21st-century Mexican painters
20th-century Mexican women artists
21st-century Mexican women artists